Śląski Kwartalnik Historyczny Sobótka (English: Silesian Historical Quarterly Sobótka) is a peer-reviewed academic journal published by Wrocławskie Towarzystwo Miłośników Historii. It was established in 1946. The founder and the first editor-in-chief was Antoni Knot.

It is considered one of the most important Polish academic journals about history. 

The journal is indexed in the European Reference Index for the Humanities. It is included in the list of academic journals of the Polish Ministry of Science and Higher Education from 2014 with 10 points.

From 1975 the editor-in-chief was Adam Galos.

Since February 2010 the editor-in-chief was Teresa Kulak.

References

External links 
 
 Issues from 2018 and 2019

History journals
Polish-language journals
Quarterly journals
Publications established in 1946
Academic journals published in Poland